Aaron Fredrick "AJ" Mitchell Jr. (born May 17, 2001), is an American singer-songwriter and musician who is currently signed to Insanity Records, a subsidiary of Sony Music. He gained a following in 2017 after posting clips of himself singing and performing covers on YouTube and Instagram. His first independent single, "Used To Be", was written by Mitchell at age 13 and has over 100 million streams.

Mitchell has four songs that have reached the Top 40 on the US radio charts, the July 2018 release "Girls", which reached No. 39, the March 2019 release "All My Friends", which reached No. 24,  "Slow Dance" (featuring Ava Max), which reached No. 28, and "Stop" from his debut studio album Skyview (2021), which reached No. 33.

Early life 
AJ Mitchell was born in Belleville, Illinois on May 17, 2001. His mother, Allison Mitchell, is a small business owner and his father, Aaron Fredrick Mitchell Sr, is a traveling nurse. AJ is the couple's only son and youngest child, after their daughters Andrea and Addison (Addy).

Mitchell began piano lessons at 4, inspired by his father, who was also learning to play piano and write songs. Mitchell attended Belleville West High School, where he played on the football team and sang in the school choir.

Career

2015–2016: Career beginnings 
By 13, Mitchell began performing at local open-mic nights in his hometown and posting covers on YouTube and Instagram, which helped him gain a significant following. Mitchell's social media fan base helped him capture the attention of the LA-based artist manager Mike Spitz whom Mitchell has worked with since 2015.

Mitchell's videos on social media granted him an opportunity to relocate to Los Angeles in 2015 to collaborate with internet marketing agency Team 10.  After a brief period together, Mitchell left the group to focus his energy entirely on music.

2017–2018: Hopeful 
In 2017, Mitchell released his first independent single "Used to Be", a song he wrote at age 13. The song was produced by hip-hop producer and engineer Mike Dean. "Used to Be" has now gained over 150 million streams.

After departing the social media group, Mitchell received interest from many different record labels but eventually decided to sign with Epic Records. He inked his first major deal with the label in February 2018.

Mitchell's first studio EP with Epic, Hopeful, was released in July 2018. Its lead single "Girls", co-written by Mitchell and Romans, reached No. 39 on the US Mediabase pop radio chart. In November 2018, Billboard and Vevo named AJ one of the top 19 artists to watch in 2019.

Epic Records CEO Sylvia Rhone referred to Mitchell's music as "exciting things to come", when discussing the growing talent roster at the record label.

In 2018, Mitchell collaborated with Bay Area R&B singer-songwriter Marteen for the song "No Plans". Marteen later joined Mitchell in a support slot on the following year's 2019 Hopeful Tour.

2019–present: Slow Dance and Skyview
In May 2019, Mitchell collaborated with songwriting duo Teamwork and Scottish singer-songwriter Nina Nesbitt on the song "After Hours".

Later that month, in an interview with Billboard, Mitchell announced that his forthcoming debut full-length album with Epic Records was nearly finished, and would be released "very, very soon".

In June 2019, Mitchell signed a new joint deal with Insanity Records, a subsidiary to Sony Music.

On August 23, 2019, Mitchell released his second EP Slow Dance, which includes his singles "Talk So Much", "Move On", and the title track featuring American singer Ava Max.

Mitchell's debut studio album Skyview was released in October 2021 and includes the singles "Used to Be", "Slow Dance", "Cameras On", and "Stop".

Artistry

Musician 
Mitchell cites a wide variety of music as influential to his songwriting style, regularly noting his admiration of artists like Bruno Mars and Lil Wayne.

Discography

Studio albums

Extended plays

Singles

As lead artist

As featured artist

Guest appearances

Tours 
 Hopeful Tour (2019)

References

External links

21st-century American male singers
21st-century American singers
American male musicians
American male singer-songwriters
American male pop singers
American pop pianists
Epic Records artists
People from Belleville, Illinois
Singer-songwriters from Illinois
Living people
2001 births
American tenors
American child singers